The 4th Guldbagge Awards ceremony, presented by the Swedish Film Institute, honored the best Swedish 1966 and 1967, and took place on 9 October 1967. Persona, directed by Ingmar Bergman, was presented with the award for Best Film.

Awards
 Best Film: Persona by Ingmar Bergman
 Best Director: Jan Troell for Here's Your Life
 Best Actor: Per Oscarsson for Hunger
 Best Actress: Bibi Andersson for Persona
 Special Achievement: Krister Wickman

References

External links
Official website
Guldbaggen on Facebook
Guldbaggen on Twitter
4th Guldbagge Awards at Internet Movie Database

1967 in Sweden
1967 film awards
Guldbagge Awards ceremonies
1960s in Stockholm
October 1967 events in Europe